Jūlija Sokolova (born 12 December 1991) is a Latvian football striker currently playing for Górnik Łęczna in the Polish Ekstraliga. She is a member of the Latvian national team.

References

1991 births
Living people
Latvian women's footballers
Latvia women's international footballers
Women's association football forwards
Gintra Universitetas players
Górnik Łęczna (women) players
Latvian expatriate footballers
Latvian expatriate sportspeople in Lithuania
Expatriate women's footballers in Lithuania
Latvian expatriate sportspeople in Poland
Expatriate women's footballers in Poland